6126 was a clothing line created by American actress Lindsay Lohan, in collaboration with Kristi Kaylor. The line was a leggings line, before being expanded to a full clothing collection. The name of the collection represents the June 1, 1926, birth date of Marilyn Monroe, whom Lohan has said she admires and has been influenced by. The line is now defunct.

Fashion
The collection originated in 2008 with leggings. Each type of legging was part of a legging brand within the company. Leggings brands included Fame, Lust, Star, and others. Kristi Kaylor, Lohan's partner, said Lohan was involved in the process of designing, choosing the fabrics, trims, and buttons for the leggings collection: "She approves everything, down to invitations for events."

6126 Collection donated all the sales from its Fame leggings to Save the Children to benefit the victims of the 2010 Haiti earthquake.

The line expanded from leggings to a full clothing collection in May 2010, with clothing including dresses, leather jackets, blazers, coats, mini [skirts] and pencil skirts, blouses, and corsets.  The fashion press reported in April 2010 that the fashion line would include a collection of handbags, shoes, and cosmetics for the Spring 2011 edition.

Retail
6126 Collection was sold at such United States retail stores as Neiman Marcus, Nordstrom, Bloomingdale's, and at D-A-S-H boutique owned by Kim Kardashian, Kourtney Kardashian, and Khloé Kardashian.  The leggings line was released on July 10, 2008, at Fred Segal and for Internet order, on the website Intuition.

Advertising
Lohan participated in numerous photo shoots and modeled to help advertise and promote the collection.

Controversy 
Photographer Scott Nathan sued Universal Music Group, Lohan's musical label, when he discovered that a photograph he shot of Lohan was used as the cover for her single "Bossy" without his permission. He also sued and prevailed over 6126's parent company after being promised a 1% interest in the clothing line for photographing Lohan in the leggings. The two settled but Nathan then claimed 6126 or Lohan paid him according to the settlement. However, as of 2020 all has been satisfied.

References

External links
 

Clothing brands of the United States
American companies established in 2008
Lindsay Lohan